Stilbosis juvantis is a moth in the family Cosmopterigidae. It was described by Ronald W. Hodges in 1964. It is found in North America, where it has been recorded from Arizona.

References

Moths described in 1964
Chrysopeleiinae
Moths of North America